Segestria pacifica is a species of tube web spiders in the family Segestriidae. It is found in the USA.

References

Further reading

 NCBI Taxonomy Browser, Segestria pacifica

Segestriidae
Spiders described in 1891